Ho-Ho-Kus is a borough in Bergen County, in the U.S. state of New Jersey. As of the 2020 United States census, the borough's population was 4,258, an increase of 180 (+4.4%) from the 2010 census count of 4,078, which in turn reflected an increase of 18 (+0.4%) from the 4,060 counted in the 2000 census. The borough is the home of several historical landmarks, including the Ho-Ho-Kus Inn and The Hermitage.

Ho-Ho-Kus was incorporated as a borough by an act of the New Jersey Legislature on October 12, 1908, from what had originally been the borough of Orvil, which was in turn created on March 8, 1905, from portions of Orvil Township.

As of the 2000 census, Ho-Ho-Kus was the 15th-wealthiest community in New Jersey with a per capita money income of $63,594 as of 1999, an increase of 36.9% from the $46,451 recorded in 1989. The borough's median household income was $165,827 in 2013. In 2011, New Jersey Monthly magazine named Ho-Ho-Kus the best place to live in the state of New Jersey, citing its affluence, low crime rate and the quality of its school system, as well as its proximity to New York City and other major commercial destinations.

History of the name 
The meaning of the name Ho-Ho-Kus has been disputed. From the official history on the borough's website, the most likely origin is a contraction of the Delaware Indian term "Mah-Ho-Ho-Kus" (or "Mehokhokus"), meaning "the red cedar".

Other meanings have been suggested over the years and are listed on the borough's website, including a Lenape word for running water, a cleft in the rock or under the rock or hollow rock, the word "hohokes", signifying the whistle of the wind against the bark of trees, the Chihohokies Indians whose chief lived here, the Dutch Hoog Akers for "high acorns" or Hoge Aukers, Dutch for "high oaks", the Lenape word hoccus meaning "fox", or woakus, "gray fox", or that the "Ho" part means joy or spirit, and the rest of the name from "hohokes", meaning a kind of bark of a tree.

Ho-Ho-Kus versus Hohokus 
A constant source of confusion has been the manner in which the borough's name has been styled, with each syllable capitalized and separated by hyphens. The confusion is only exacerbated by the existence of Hohokus Township (now Mahwah), which comprised the area of present-day Ho-Ho-Kus and other surrounding communities, yet was styled without the multiple capitalization or the hyphens.  Ho-Ho-Kus is served by interchange 168 on the Garden State Parkway which lists the municipality as "Hohokus" on its exit signing.

The name "Ho-Ho-Kus" was used explicitly in the resolution requesting a change of name passed by the Borough Council on October 12, 1908 and submitted to the Secretary of State of New Jersey requesting "That the Borough now known as the Borough of Orvil be hereafter known as the Borough of Ho-Ho-Kus..."

A few theories have been offered for the hyphens and capitalization. One is that it was intended to differentiate between the borough and Hohokus Township, which was formed on April 9, 1849, and continued to exist until November 7, 1944, when a referendum was passed changing the name to present-day Mahwah. Another explanation was that it was meant to avoid confusion by postal clerks with mail being sent to Hoboken.

While efforts had been made in the ensuing decades to change the name or to alter the way in which the name of the borough is capitalized and punctuated, the borough remains as "Ho-Ho-Kus."

Geography

According to the United States Census Bureau, the borough had a total area of 1.75 square miles (4.53 km2), including 1.74 square miles (4.51 km2) of land and 0.01 square miles (0.03 km2) of water (0.63%).

The borough borders Hillsdale, Ridgewood, Saddle River, Waldwick and Washington Township.

Demographics

2010 census

The Census Bureau's 2006–2010 American Community Survey showed that (in 2010 inflation-adjusted dollars) median household income was $155,030 (with a margin of error of +/− $14,301) and the median family income was $157,202 (+/− $13,820). Males had a median income of $93,750 (+/− $26,877) versus $83,636 (+/− $27,361) for females. The per capita income for the borough was $67,238 (+/− $11,693). About 1.9% of families and 1.6% of the population were below the poverty line, including 0.6% of those under age 18 and 6.3% of those age 65 or over.

Same-sex couples headed 8 households in 2010, unchanged from 2000.

2000 census
As of the 2000 United States census there were 4,060 people, 1,433 households, and 1,199 families residing in the borough.  The population density was 2,331.1 people per square mile (900.9/km2).  There were 1,465 housing units at an average density of 841.2 per square mile (325.1/km2).  The racial makeup of the borough was 92.66% White, 0.59% African American, 0.10% Native American, 5.22% Asian, 0.20% Pacific Islander, 0.37% from other races, and 0.86% from two or more races.  1.97% of the population were Hispanic or Latino of any race.

There were 1,433 households, out of which 38.7% had children under the age of 18 living with them, 76.6% were married couples living together, 6.1% had a female householder with no husband present, and 16.3% were non-families. Of all households 14.6% were made up of individuals, and 7.1% had someone living alone who was 65 years of age or older. The average household size was 2.82 and the average family size was 3.11.

In the borough the population was spread out, with 27.5% under the age of 18, 3.3% from 18 to 24, 26.6% from 25 to 44, 27.3% from 45 to 64, and 15.2% who were 65 years of age or older. The median age was 41 years. For every 100 females, there were 91.9 males.  For every 100 females age 18 and over, there were 88.2 males.

The median income for a household in the borough was $129,900, and the median income for a family was $144,588. Males had a median income of $92,573 versus $54,091 for females. The per capita income for the borough was $63,594.  Of the population 2.1% of the people and 2.6% of families were below the poverty line. Of those 0.7% under the age of 18 and 1.6% of those 65 and older were living below the poverty line.

Affluence 

Ho-Ho-Kus is primarily an upper-class and upper-middle class suburb of New York City, ranking 15th in the state of New Jersey in terms of per-capita income. According to the Forbes 2010 survey of the most expensive ZIP codes in America, Ho-Ho-Kus ranked 268th nationally, with a median home price of $901,841.

The Ho-Ho-Kus School District is classified in District Factor Group "J," the highest of eight categories, in both the 2000 and 1990 rankings. District Factor Groups are used in the state of New Jersey to rank school districts according to common socioeconomic characteristics. Northern Highlands Regional High School, which receives students from Ho-Ho-Kus, Allendale, Upper Saddle River, and part of Saddle River, is placed in the same category.

Points of interest 

 The Hermitage, site of Aaron Burr's marriage, listed on the National Register of Historic Places
 The Ho-Ho-Kus Inn (also known as Ho-Ho-Kus Inn & Tavern), is a historic landmark that is currently a restaurant.

Government

Local government 
Ho-Ho-Kus is governed under the Borough form of New Jersey municipal government, which is used in 218 municipalities (of the 564) statewide, making it the most common form of government in New Jersey. The governing body is comprised of a Mayor and a Borough Council, with all positions elected at-large on a partisan basis as part of the November general election. A Mayor is elected directly by the voters to a four-year term of office. The Borough Council is comprised of six members elected to serve three-year terms on a staggered basis, with two seats coming up for election each year in a three-year cycle. The Borough form of government used by Ho-Ho-Kus is a "weak mayor / strong council" government in which council members act as the legislative body with the mayor presiding at meetings and voting only in the event of a tie. The mayor can veto ordinances subject to an override by a two-thirds majority vote of the council. The mayor makes committee and liaison assignments for council members, and most appointments are made by the mayor with the advice and consent of the council.

, the Mayor of Ho-Ho-Kus is Republican Thomas W. Randall, whose term of office ends December 31, 2023. Members of the Borough Council are Council President Douglas K. Troast (R, 2024), Kevin Crossley (R, 2025), Edmund M. Iannelli (R, 2023), Kathleen Moran (R, 2025), Dane M. Policastro (R, 2024) and Steven D. Shell (R, 2023).

In February 2020, Kathleen Moran was selected from three candidates nominated by the Republican municipal committee to fill the seat expiring in December 2022 that had been held by Philip Rorty until he resigned from office earlier that month. Moran served on an interim basis until the November 2020 general election, when she was elected to serve the balance of the term of office.

Thomas Fiato was selected in January 2016 from a list of three candidates nominated by the municipal Republican committee to fill the seat of Kimberley Weiss, who had resigned earlier that month after announcing that she was relocating out of the borough.

William J. Jones is the Borough Administrator.

Federal, state and county representation 
Ho-Ho-Kus is located in New Jersey's 5th congressional district and is part of the 40th state legislative district. Prior to the 2011 reapportionment following the 2010 Census, Ho-Ho-Kus had been in the 39th state legislative district.

Politics 
As of March 2011, there was a total of 2,981 registered voters in Ho-Ho-Kus, of whom 546 (18.3% vs. 31.7% countywide) were registered as Democrats, 1,456 (48.8% vs. 21.1%) were registered as Republicans and 976 (32.7% vs. 47.1%) were registered as Unaffiliated. There were 3 voters registered as Libertarians or Greens. Among the borough's 2010 Census population, 73.1% (vs. 57.1% in Bergen County) were registered to vote, including 103.3% of those ages 18 and over (vs. 73.7% countywide).

In the 2016 presidential election, Republican Donald Trump received 1,171 votes (48.1% vs. 41.1% countywide), ahead of Democrat Hillary Clinton with 1,131 votes (46.5% vs. 54.2%) and other candidates with 131 votes (5.4% vs. 4.6%), among the 2,462 ballots cast by the borough's 3,234 registered voters, for a turnout of 76.1% (vs. 72.5% in Bergen County). In the 2012 presidential election, Republican Mitt Romney received 1,447 votes (62.8% vs. 43.5% countywide), ahead of Democrat Barack Obama with 826 votes (35.9% vs. 54.8%) and other candidates with 21 votes (0.9% vs. 0.9%), among the 2,303 ballots cast by the borough's 3,116 registered voters, for a turnout of 73.9% (vs. 70.4% in Bergen County). In the 2008 presidential election, Republican John McCain received 1,440 votes (58.1% vs. 44.5% countywide), ahead of Democrat Barack Obama with 1,009 votes (40.7% vs. 53.9%) and other candidates with 15 votes (0.6% vs. 0.8%), among the 2,478 ballots cast by the borough's 3,066 registered voters, for a turnout of 80.8% (vs. 76.8% in Bergen County). In the 2004 presidential election, Republican George W. Bush received 1,547 votes (62.2% vs. 47.2% countywide), ahead of Democrat John Kerry with 916 votes (36.8% vs. 51.7%) and other candidates with 18 votes (0.7% vs. 0.7%), among the 2,489 ballots cast by the borough's 2,987 registered voters, for a turnout of 83.3% (vs. 76.9% in the whole county).

In the 2013 gubernatorial election, Republican Chris Christie received 74.4% of the vote (1,085 cast), ahead of Democrat Barbara Buono with 24.6% (358 votes), and other candidates with 1.0% (15 votes), among the 1,479 ballots cast by the borough's 3,042 registered voters (21 ballots were spoiled), for a turnout of 48.6%. In the 2009 gubernatorial election, Republican Chris Christie received 1,063 votes (62.5% vs. 45.8% countywide), ahead of Democrat Jon Corzine with 553 votes (32.5% vs. 48.0%), Independent Chris Daggett with 76 votes (4.5% vs. 4.7%) and other candidates with 3 votes (0.2% vs. 0.5%), among the 1,701 ballots cast by the borough's 3,024 registered voters, yielding a 56.3% turnout (vs. 50.0% in the county).

Education 

The Ho-Ho-Kus School District serves public school students in pre-kindergarten through eighth grade at Ho-Ho-Kus Public School. As of the 2020–21 school year, the district, comprised of one school, had an enrollment of 597 students and 49.7 classroom teachers (on an FTE basis), for a student–teacher ratio of 12.0:1. The school population increased more than 200 students in the decade through 2008.

Local secondary school students in public school attend Northern Highlands Regional High School in nearby Allendale, which serves students in the ninth through twelfth grades grades from Allendale, Ho-Ho-Kus, Upper Saddle River and some students from Saddle River, as part of sending/receiving relationships with the Ho-Ho-Kus district. As of the 2020–21 school year, the high school had an enrollment of 1,364 students and 106.3 classroom teachers (on an FTE basis), for a student–teacher ratio of 12.8:1. New Jersey Monthly magazine ranked Northern Highlands Regional High School as the 22nd-best high school of the 328 ranked schools in New Jersey in its 2012 rankings of the "Top Public High Schools" after being ranked 6th of 322 schools in 2010. The ten voting seats on the high school district's board of education are allocated based on a percentage of the enrollment coming from each constituent municipality, with one seat allocated to Ho-Ho-Kus.

After ending a long-standing sending relationship to Ridgewood High School in the mid-1970s, Ho-Ho-Kus students started attending Midland Park High School. The small size of the Midland Park school and the lack of electives led to efforts in the mid-1990s to find another high school to serve students from the borough. Since then, high school students from Ho-Ho-Kus have been attending Northern Highlands Regional High School. The send / receive agreement between Ho-Ho-Kus and Northern Highlands began in the 1990s. In 2016, the Ho-Ho-Kus and Northern Highlands districts reached an agreement to extend the send / receive agreement through 2026 under a fixed-price contract by which Ho-Ho-Kus would pay $3.6 million for the 2016–2017 school year, escalating by 2% a year to $4.3 million in 2025–2026, regardless of the number of students from the borough sent to the high school.

Public school students from the borough, and all of Bergen County, are eligible to attend the secondary education programs offered by the Bergen County Technical Schools, which include the Bergen County Academies in Hackensack, and the Bergen Tech campus in Teterboro or Paramus. The district offers programs on a shared-time or full-time basis, with admission based on a selective application process and tuition covered by the student's home school district.

The borough is home to the Ho-Ho-Kus Waldwick Cooperative Nursery School.

Transportation

Roads and highways

Route 17, County Route 507, and County Route 502 travel through Ho-Ho-Kus.

Ho-Ho-Kus can also be accessed via exit 168 on the Garden State Parkway in neighboring Washington Township.

Public transportation
Ho-Ho-Kus is served by NJ Transit at the Ho-Ho-Kus station, which is located at Brookside Avenue and 1st Street, one block from Franklin Turnpike. The station provides service on both the Bergen County Line and Main Line, which run north–south to Hoboken Terminal with connections via the Secaucus Junction transfer station to NJ Transit New York Penn Station and to other NJ Transit rail service. Connections are available at the Hoboken Terminal to other NJ Transit rail lines, the PATH train at the Hoboken PATH station, New York Waterways ferry service to the World Financial Center and other destinations and Hudson-Bergen Light Rail service.

Short Line provides service between the borough and the Port Authority Bus Terminal in Midtown Manhattan from a stop at Route 17 and Hollywood Avenue, with limited service offered at a stop at Franklin Turnpike and Maple Avenue.

In popular culture
The heavy metal band Twisted Sister,  best known for the songs "We're Not Gonna Take It" and "I Wanna Rock", was based in Ho-Ho-Kus.

Notable people

People who were born in, residents of, or otherwise closely associated with Ho-Ho-Kus include:
 Aaron Burr (1756–1836), third Vice President of the United States, was married at The Hermitage and briefly lived there
 Richard Chilton (born 1958), businessman, investor and philanthropist
 David Duffield (born 1941), businessman and founder of Information Associates, Integral Software Systems, Business Software, PeopleSoft, and Workday
 Jim Fassel (1949–2021), head coach of the New York Giants
 Andrew McMahon (born 1982), musician / singer-songwriter who has been lead singer of Jack's Mannequin and Something Corporate.
 Dennis McNerney, former County Executive of Bergen County
 Dan Reeves (1944–2022), former running back of the Dallas Cowboys, former head coach of the New York Giants
 R. Tom Sawyer (1901–1986), engineer, writer and inventor of the first successful gas turbine locomotive
 Metta Victoria Fuller Victor (1831–1885), novelist, credited with authoring of one of the first American detective novels who wrote more than 100 dime novels, pioneering the field
 Orville James Victor (1827–1910), theologian, journalist, editor and abolitionist who has been called the creator of the dime novel
 Richard Warch (1939–2013), 14th president of Lawrence University
 Luke Wypler (born 2000/01), American football center for the Ohio State Buckeyes.

Sources 
 Municipal Incorporations of the State of New Jersey (according to Counties) prepared by the Division of Local Government, Department of the Treasury (New Jersey); December 1, 1958.
 Clayton, W. Woodford; and Nelson, William. History of Bergen and Passaic Counties, New Jersey, with Biographical Sketches of Many of its Pioneers and Prominent Men. Philadelphia: Everts and Peck, 1882.
 Harvey, Cornelius Burnham (ed.), Genealogical History of Hudson and Bergen Counties, New Jersey. New York: New Jersey Genealogical Publishing Co., 1900.
 Hudson, Sue F., Background of Ho-Ho-Kus History, under the auspices of the Woman's Club of Ho-Ho-Kus, New Jersey, 1953
 Van Valen, James M. History of Bergen County, New Jersey. New York: New Jersey Publishing and Engraving Co., 1900.
 Westervelt, Frances A. (Frances Augusta), 1858–1942, History of Bergen County, New Jersey, 1630–1923, Lewis Historical Publishing Company, 1923.

References

External links

Ho-Ho-Kus borough website
Ho-Ho-Kus Public School

School Data for the Ho-Ho-Kus Public School, National Center for Education Statistics
Northern Highlands Regional High School
Police Department

 
1908 establishments in New Jersey
Borough form of New Jersey government
Boroughs in Bergen County, New Jersey
Populated places established in 1908